Malvasia di Castelnuovo Don Bosco is a sweet, sparkling, red or rosé DOC dessert wine produced in the Italian province of Asti from the Malvasia di Schierano grape variety with the optional addition of up to 15% Freisa.

The wine is cherry red in colour with an aroma typical of the grape and 'reminiscent of dog roses and scents of red berries.' The flavour is sweet and aromatic with characteristic tannins. It is made in both lightly (frizzante) and fully sparkling (spumante) versions; the regulations also permit it to be made as a still wine.

Production zone
The production regulations require that the grapes are grown on the hills within the borders of the following communes of the Province of Asti: Albugnano, Castelnuovo Don Bosco, Passerano Marmorito, Pino d’Asti, Berzano di San Pietro and Moncucco Torinese. The wine itself is preferably made in the same area, however vinification is allowed elsewhere in the Province of Asti and the wine is currently produced also in wineries in Cocconato and Calosso.

Production volumes

Notes

References

 (See also the linked pages.)

Italian DOC
Wines of Piedmont
Province of Asti
Castelnuovo Don Bosco